Wang Weicheng (born 2 September 1991 in Chongqing) is a Chinese football player who plays as midfielder for Chinese club Chongqing Tongliangloong.

Club career
Wang Weicheng started his football career when he was promoted to Chongqing Lifan's first team in the 2010 season. On 4 May 2011, he made his senior debut in the first round of 2011 Chinese FA Cup against Beijing Baxy. He scored his first goal in the match, which ensured Chongqing's 3–0 home victory. Wang made his Super League debut on 6 March 2016, in a 2–1 home win against Guangzhou Evergrande, coming on as a substitute for Fernandinho in the 86th minute.

Career statistics 
.

Honours

Club
Chongqing Lifan
China League One: 2014

References

External links
 

1991 births
Living people
Association football midfielders
Chinese footballers
Footballers from Chongqing
Chongqing Liangjiang Athletic F.C. players
Chinese Super League players
China League One players